Laws of Attraction (Simplified Chinese: 寂寞同盟) is a Malaysian 2012 Mandarin drama series produced by Double Vision and NTV7. It was scheduled to be broadcast every Monday to Thursday at 10:00pm on NTV7, replacing The Descendant, starting on 3 April 2012.

Cast

References

Chinese-language drama television series in Malaysia
2012 Malaysian television series debuts
2012 Malaysian television series endings
NTV7 original programming